Martin Standmann (born 18 June 1968) is an Austrian cross-country skier. He competed in the men's 30 kilometre classical event at the 1992 Winter Olympics.

References

External links
 

1968 births
Living people
Austrian male cross-country skiers
Olympic cross-country skiers of Austria
Cross-country skiers at the 1992 Winter Olympics
Place of birth missing (living people)
20th-century Austrian people